Robert Lee Thompson (March 30, 1939 – March 11, 2014) was an American and Canadian football player who played for the Montreal Alouettes, Detroit Lions and New Orleans Saints. He won the Grey Cup with Montreal in 1970. He previously played college football at University of Arizona.

References

1939 births
2014 deaths
Sportspeople from Minden, Louisiana
Players of American football from Louisiana
American players of Canadian football
American football defensive backs
Canadian football defensive backs
Arizona Wildcats football players
Montreal Alouettes players
Detroit Lions players
New Orleans Saints players